DeAngelo Rico-Thomas Peterson (born January 11, 1989) is a former American football tight end. He played college football at Louisiana State University. He signed with St. Louis Rams as an undrafted free agent in 2012.

College career
Peterson played college football at LSU. In his freshman year, he played in 13 games and recorded 6 tackles mainly on special teams.

In his sophomore year, he had 5 receptions, 82 receiving yards, 2 receiving touchdowns. On November 7, 2009, he recorded 2 receptions for 40 yards and a touchdown against No.3 ranked Alabama but LSU lost 24-15. On November 28, 2009, he had a 15-yard receiving touchdown against Arkansas as LSU won in Overtime 33-30.

In his junior year, he had 16 receptions and 198 receiving yards. On October 2, 2010, he recorded 5 receptions for 45 yards against Tennessee helping No.12 ranked LSU wins 16-14. On October 9, 2010, he recorded 2 receptions for 38 yards against No.14 ranked Florida as LSU wins 33-29.

In his senior year, he played in 14 games (5 starts) and had 18 receptions, 179 receiving yards and receiving touchdown. On September 3, 2011, he recorded 4 receptions for 62 yards against No. 3 ranked Oregon helping LSU win 40-27. On September 10, 2011, he had a nine-yard reception against Northwestern State as LSU wins 49-3. On January 9, 2012, in the BCS Championship Game, he recorded one reception for 7 yards.

Statistics

Source:

Professional career

St. Louis Rams
On April 30, 2012, Peterson signed as an undrafted free agent with the St. Louis Rams following the 2012 NFL Draft. On August 31, 2012, he was released during final roster cuts.

Washington Redskins
On September 3, 2012, he signed with the Washington Redskins to join the practice squad.

Peterson was signed to reserve contract on January 8, 2013. On June 12, the Redskins waived-injured him due to a broken foot. The next day he cleared waivers and was placed on the team's injured reserve. On July 25, 2013, Peterson was waived by the Washington Redskins.

Denver Broncos
On August 6, 2013, Peterson was signed by the Denver Broncos. On August 25, 2013, he was waived by the Broncos.

References

External links
 College stats
 LSU Tigers bio 
 St. Louis Rams bio 
 Washington Redskins bio

1989 births
Living people
St. Louis Rams players
Washington Redskins players
Denver Broncos players
Players of American football from New Orleans